"Lady Grinning Soul" is a ballad written by English musician David Bowie, released on the album Aladdin Sane in 1973. It was a last-minute addition, replacing the "sax version" of "John, I'm Only Dancing" as the closing track. The composer's first meeting with American soul singer Claudia Lennear in 1972 is often cited as the inspiration for the song. In 2016, after Bowie's death, an interview with Lennear revealed that Bowie called her in 2014, and told her the song had been written about her.

The style of the piece has been compared to a James Bond theme. Pianist Mike Garson described his own performance as "about as romantic as it gets ... French with a little Franz Liszt thrown in there". Rolling Stones contemporary review called Bowie's singing "the album's most expansive and sincere vocal", while author Nicholas Pegg considers the track "one of Bowie's most underrated recordings ... quite unlike anything else he has ever done". Mojo magazine listed it as Bowie's 93rd best track in 2015.

The track was used in the films The Runaways (2010) and Diana Vreeland: The Eye Has to Travel (2012).

Recording
With the release of his album The Rise and Fall of Ziggy Stardust and the Spiders from Mars and his performance of "Starman" on the BBC television programme Top of the Pops in early July 1972, David Bowie was launched to stardom. To support the album, Bowie embarked on the Ziggy Stardust Tour in both the UK and the US. He composed most of the tracks for the follow-up record on the road during the US tour in late 1972. Because of this, many of the tracks were influenced by America, and his perceptions of the country.

"Lady Grinning Soul" was recorded at Trident Studios in London in January 1973, following the conclusion of the American tour and a series of Christmas concerts in England and Scotland. Like the rest of its parent album, the song was co-produced by Bowie and Ken Scott and featured Bowie's backing band the Spiders from Mars – comprising guitarist Mick Ronson, bassist Trevor Bolder and drummer Woody Woodmansey, as well as pianist Mike Garson and saxophonist Ken Fordham.

Other releases
 It was released as the B-side of the single "Let's Spend the Night Together" in June 1973.
 It was also the B-side of the Spanish release of the single "Sorrow" in November 1973.
 The US release of the single "Rebel Rebel" had "Lady Grinning Soul" as the B-side.
 It appeared as the B-side of the Japanese release of the single "1984" in April 1974.

Cover versions
 Chris Brokaw – The Hand That Wrote This Letter (2017)
 Anna Calvi – Strange Weather (EP) (2014)
 Ulf Lundell – Sweethearts (Swedish translation called "Elden")
Janette Mason performed it on her 2014 album D'Ranged
 Lucia Micarelli – Instrumental version on Music From a Farther Room (2004)
 Momus – Turpsycore (2015) 
 Mystéfy - Spark Within (2016)
 Camille O'Sullivan – Changeling (2012)
 Paul Roberts – Faith (1999)
 Petra Taylor - Cover Ups (2019)

Personnel
According to Chris O'Leary:
David Bowie – lead vocal, 12-string acoustic guitar
Mick Ronson – lead and rhythm guitar
Trevor Bolder – bass
Woody Woodmansey – drums
Mike Garson – piano
Ken Fordham – baritone saxophoneTechnical'
David Bowie – producer
Ken Scott – producer, engineer

See also
Music of the James Bond series (inspiration)

Notes

References

Sources

David Bowie songs
1973 songs
Songs written by David Bowie
Song recordings produced by Ken Scott
Song recordings produced by David Bowie
Rock ballads
1970s ballads